Ajmal Khan is an Afghan cricketer. He made his List A debut for Mis Ainak Region in the 2017 Ghazi Amanullah Khan Regional One Day Tournament on 13 August 2017. He made his first-class debut for Mis Ainak Region in the 2017–18 Ahmad Shah Abdali 4-day Tournament on 25 November 2017.

References

External links
 

Year of birth missing (living people)
Living people
Afghan cricketers
Kabul Eagles cricketers
Mis Ainak Knights cricketers
Place of birth missing (living people)